Each year, the Academy Award for Best Picture is presented by one or more artists on behalf of the Academy of Motion Picture Arts and Sciences. Best Picture is traditionally the final award presented during the annual ceremonies, as this award represents a culmination of all factors of the filmmaking process. Jack Nicholson has presented the award more times than any other individual, at eight times, followed by Audrey Hepburn and Warren Beatty, who have presented the award four times each.

List of presenters

Notes 
At the 89th Academy Awards, the presenters of the award, Warren Beatty and Faye Dunaway, mistakenly announced La La Land as the winner of Best Picture, after they had been given the envelope for Best Actress – containing the name of Emma Stone and La La Land, the film for which she won Best Actress. A few minutes later, after the mistake came to light, one of La La Land's producers, Jordan Horowitz, informed the audience that Moonlight was the true winner.

See also 

 Academy Award
 Academy Award for Best Picture

References

Academy Awards lists